Fred Everiss (1882–1951) was secretary-manager of the English football club West Bromwich Albion for 46 years from 1902 to 1948, later serving the club as a director after retirement in 1948. Everiss led Albion to the League Title in the 1919–20 season and to the FA Cup in 1931.

Everiss joined Albion's office staff in 1896. He was appointed secretary-manager in 1902, a post he would hold until 1948. His 46 years in the job technically make him English football's longest-serving manager of all time, although much of his combined role was administrative, and the job of picking the team was left to the directors. Indeed, Albion did not create the full-time post of 'manager' until Everiss left his position. He was made a director upon his retirement in 1948 but died three years later in 1951 at the age of 68.

Everiss' son Alan joined the Albion staff in 1933. He was associated with the club for 66 years, serving as clerk, assistant-secretary, secretary, director and life member.

Honours 
Football League First Division
Champions: 1919-20
Runners-up: 1924-25

Football League Second Division
Champions: 1901-02, 1910-11
Runners-up: 1930-31

FA Cup
Winners: 1931
Runners-up: 1912, 1935
Semi-finalists: 1907

FA Charity Shield
Winners: 1920
Runners-up: 1931

See also 
 List of English football championship winning managers
 List of longest managerial reigns in association football

References

  Date of Fred Everiss' death 
 Albion's timeline  WBA Official website

External links

1882 births
Sportspeople from West Bromwich
West Bromwich Albion F.C. managers
English football managers
1951 deaths